Pelli Kanuka may refer to
 Pelli Kanuka (1960 film)
 Pelli Kanuka (1998 film)